The following is a list of notable deaths in June 2000.

Entries for each day are listed alphabetically by surname. A typical entry lists information in the following sequence:
 Name, age, country of citizenship at birth, subsequent country of citizenship (if applicable), reason for notability, cause of death (if known), and reference.

June 2000

1
Oskar Czerwenka, 75, Austrian operatic bass and academic teacher.
Sir Raymond Ferrall, 94, Australian businessman and author.
Edgar Z. Friedenberg, 79, American scholar of gender studies.
Charles Grieve, 86, British rugby player.
Mary Mdziniso, Swazi educator and politician.
 Tito Puente,singer

2
Ellis Clary, 83, American baseball player.
Svyatoslav Fyodorov, 72, Russian ophthalmologist (a pioneer of refractive surgery) and politician.
Mikhail Schweitzer, 80, Soviet film director.
Lepo Sumera, 50, Estonian composer.
Gerald James Whitrow, 87, British mathematician, cosmologist and science historian.

3
T. K. Ann, 87, Hong Kong industrialist and legislator.
Leonard Baskin, 77, American sculptor, visual artist and writer.
Ted Graber, American interior designer.
Jack K. Horton, American lawyer and business executive.
Jaishankar, 61, Indian actor, heart attack.
Merton Miller, 77, American Nobel Prize-winning economist.
Bob Rogers, 78, South African Air Force officer.
William E. Simon, 72, American politician and businessman.

4
Clarence Holbrook Carter, 96, American artist.
Sir James Glover, 71, British army general.
Takashi Kano, 79, Japanese football player, heart failure.
Richard A. Peterson, 77, United States Army Air Forces flying ace.
Hiroji Satoh, 75, Japanese table tennis player.
Augusta H. Teller, 91, American scientist and computer programmer.
Paul Zoungrana, 82, Burkinabé Cardinal of the Roman Catholic Church.

5
Carl-Erik Creutz, 88, Finnish radio announcer.
Houshang Golshiri, 62, Iranian writer and critic, meningitis.
Don Liddle, 75, American baseball player, threw pitch that produced Willie Mays' sensational "The Catch" in 1954 World Series.
Eugene M. Zuckert, 88, US Secretary of the Air Force, pneumonia complicated by a heart ailment.

6
Blair Clark, 82, American journalist and political activist.
Frédéric Dard, 78, French writer.
Arnie Johnson, 80, American professional basketball player.
Seiroku Kajiyama, 74, Japanese politician.
Alexander Evert Kawilarang, 80, Indonesian freedom fighter and military commander.
Håkan Lidman, 85, Swedish athlete.
Joan Tate, 77, English translator.
Feltus Taylor, 38, American convicted murderer, execution by lethal injection.

7
Willard Somers Elliot, 73, American bassoonist and composer.
Lady Mary Grosvenor, 89, British motor racing and rally driver.
Göran Magnusson, 58, Swedish chemist.
James Moore, 44, American gospel musician, colon cancer.
Ljubiša Savić, 41, Bosnian Serb paramilitary commander and post-war politician, murdered.
Rose Whelan Sedgewick, 96, American  mathematician.

8
Hart Amos, 83, Australian comic strip writer and artist.
Jack Gaud, 42, Indian actor, heart attack.
Geoffrey Hunter, 74, British professor and logician.
Donald Kalish, 80, American logician and anti-war activist.
Jeff MacNelly, 52, American editorial cartoonist and the creator of the comic strip Shoe.
Horace Elmo Nichols, 87, American jurist.
Kermit Roosevelt Jr., 84, American intelligence officer.
Stephen Saunders, 52, British Army officer, assassinated.
Jaswinder Kaur Sidhu, 24, Indo-Canadian beautician, honour killing.
Norman A. Erbe, 80, American politician, Iowa governor from 1961 to 1963

9
John Abramovic, 81, Croatian-American professional basketball player.
Sir John Balcombe, 74, British jurist, Lord Justice of Appeal.
Shay Brennan, 63, Irish footballer.
Ernst Jandl, 74, Austrian writer.
Jacob Lawrence, 82, American painter and educator.
George Segal, 75, American painter and sculptor.

10
Rômulo Arantes, 42, Brazilian swimmer and actor, airplane crash.
Hafez al-Assad, 69, President of Syria.
Orla Hyllested, 87, Danish union representative and politician.
William McMillan, 71, American sports shooter and Olympic champion.
Frank Patterson, 61, Irish tenor.
Brian Statham, 69, English professional cricketer.

11
Michel Besnier, 71, French heir and businessman.
Lew Gallo, 71, American actor and television producer (Twelve O'Clock High, The Twilight Zone).
Elizabeth Lawrence, 77, American actress, cancer.
Rajesh Pilot, 55, Indian Air Force officer and politician, traffic accident.
Ruth Rubin, 93, Canadian-American folklorist, singer, and scholar of Yiddish culture and music.
Claus Westermann, 90, German theologian.

12
Leonard Appelbee, 85, English painter and printmaker.
Yun Bulong, 62, Chinese politician, Chairman of Inner Mongolia, train-car collision.
Edwin R. Chess, 87, American major general and Chief of Chaplains of the US Air Force.
Sir Roualeyn Cumming-Bruce, 88, British jurist.
Dave Russell, 86, Scottish football player and manager.

13
Robert Dienst, 72, Austrian football player.
Yefim Gamburg, 75, Soviet and Russian animation director.
Mitchell Olenski, 80, American football player and coach.
Ágnes Ságvári, 71, Hungarian historian.
Bobby Tiefenauer, 70, American baseball player.

14
Frederic G. Cassidy, 92, Jamaican-American linguist and lexicographer.
Paul Griffin, 62, American musician.
Robert Trent Jones, 93, English-born golf course designer.
Peter McWilliams, 50, American author.
Reg Preston, 83, Australian potter.
Elsie Widdowson, 93, British chemist, dietitian and nutritionist.

15
Neville Ford, 93, English cricketer.
Hattie Littles, 63, American soul singer, heart attack.
Barbara Macdonald, 86, American social worker and activist, Alzheimer's disease.
Grant MacEwan, 97, Canadian farmer and politician.
Jules Roy, 92, Algerian-born French writer.
Kalle Svensson, 74, Swedish football goalkeeper.
Mina Urgan, 84, Turkish academic, author and politician.
 Kim Hwan-Sung, 19, A Member of NRG.

16
Elvin A. Kabat, 85, American microbiologist.
Empress Kōjun, 97, Empress of Japan.
Peter Moore, 76, British Anglican priest.
Eric Musgreave, 78, Canadian politician, died of a stroke in 2000.
Mike Silliman, 56, American basketball player, heart attack.

17
Joe Albanese, 66, American baseball player.
Bill Dodgin Jr., 68, English  football player and manager, Alzheimer's disease.
Jack Lindwall, 81, Australian rugby player, died in June 2000 aged 81.
Ismail Mahomed, 68, South African lawyer (Chief Justice of South Africa), pancreatic cancer.
Floyd Millet, 88, American sportsman and college athletics administrator.

18
Ekrem Alican, Turkish politician, Deputy Prime Minister.
Nancy Marchand, 71, American actress (Lou Grant, The Sopranos).
Boris Vasilyev, 63, Russian cyclist and Olympian.

19
Mary Benson, 80, South African civil rights activist, died on 19 June 2000.
Anton Gorchev, 60, Bulgarian actor born in 1939.
Christiane Herzog, 63, wife of Roman Herzog, former President of Germany, cancer.
William Papas, 72, South African-born British political cartoonist and caricaturist.
Harry Riccobene, 90, American crime figure.
Noboru Takeshita, 76, Japanese politician and the 74th Prime Minister of Japan (1987–1989), stroke.

20
Basanta Choudhury, 72, Indian actor.
Ron Lamb, 56, American football player.
Alan Basil de Lastic, 70, Burmese clergyman in India, car crash.
Chanchal Kumar Majumdar, 61, Indian physicist.
Carlota O'Neill, 95, Spanish feminist writer and journalist.

21
Claude Bissell, 84, Canadian author and educator.
Ronny Coutteure, 48, Belgian actor, director, author, TV presenter and restaurateur, suicide by hanging.
Ezequiel Ataucusi Gamonal, 82, Peruvian politician and self-proclaimed prophet, kidney failure.
Alan Hovhaness, 89, American composer.
Thomas Harrison Provenzano, 51, American convicted murderer, execution by lethal injection.
Billy Sperrin, 78, English football player and coach.
Bud Stewart, 84, American baseball player.

22
Kedarnath Agarwal, 89, Indian poet and writer.
Thomas Barfett, 83, British Anglican priest.
Philippe Chatrier, 74, French tennis player.
Shaka Sankofa, 36, American death-row inmate, execution by lethal injection.
John Smith, 66, British Anglican priest.
Al Ulmer, 83, American intelligence officer.
Harry Usher, 61, American attorney, heart attack.

23
Shawkat Akbar, 63, Bangladeshi film actor.
Scott Baker, 43, American racing driver.
Geng Biao, 90, Chinese politician.
Enrico Cuccia, 92, Italian banker.
Peter Dubovský, 28, Slovak footballer, fall from cliff.
Ed Hughes, 72, American football player and coach.
Keith Reemtsma, 74, American transplant surgeon, liver cancer.
Jerome Richardson, 79, American jazz musician, heart failure.
Jim Roper, 83, American NASCAR driver.
Bob Tillman, 63, American baseball player.

24
Vera Atkins, 92, Romanian-British intelligence officer and SOE operative during World War II.)
Enoch Dogolea, 48, Liberian politician, Vice President of Liberia (1997–2000).
Duncan Kyle, 70, British novelist.
Charles Andrew MacGillivary, 83, American Medal of Honor recipient.
Sadiq Hussain Qureshi, 72, Pakistani politician.
Rodrigo, 27, Argentine singer.
Mike Todorovich, 77, American basketball player and coach.
David Tomlinson, 83, English actor (Mary Poppins, Bedknobs and Broomsticks, The Love Bug).

25
Barbara Christian, 56, American author and professor of African-American Studies, lung cancer.
Wilson Simonal, 62, Brazilian singer.
Judith Wright, 85, Australian poet, environmentalist and Aboriginal rights activist.

26
Ken Bell, 85, Canadian war photographer.
Stig Engström, 66, Swedish graphic designer and suspected murderer of Olof Palme.
Lucien Laurin, 88, French-Canadian jockey and horse trainer.
Corneliu Mănescu, 84, Romanian diplomat.
Logan Ramsey, 79, American character actor.

27
Larry Kelley, 85, American football player, suicide.
Maurice McLaughlin, 76, American politician.
David Neal, 68, English actor.
Pierre Pflimlin, 93, French politician.
Harry Prowell, 63, Guyanese long distance runner.
Krishna Riboud, 73, Indian historian and art collector.
Tobin Rote, 72, American football player, heart attack.

28
Jane Birdwood, 87, British politician.
John Terence Coppock, 79, British geographer.
Sir William Glock, 92, British arts administrator and music critic.
Dick James, 66, American football player.
Anton Tamarut, 67, Croatian Roman Catholic prelate.
Arnie Weinmeister, 77, American football player (New York Giants) and member of the Pro Football Hall of Fame.

29
John Abineri, 72, English actor.
John Aspinall, 74, British zoo owner.
Vittorio Gassman, 77, Italian actor.
Leo Martello, 69, American Wiccan priest, gay rights activist, and author, cancer.
Rodney Nuckey, 71, English racing driver.

30
W. David Kingery, 73, American material scientist, heart attack.
Franklin D. Miller, 55, US Army Special Forces staff sergeant during the Vietnam War, cancer.
Willis Tucker, 77, American politician and newspaper editor.
Nikolai Yeremenko Sr., 74, Belarusian/Soviet actor.

References 

2000-06
 06